The Measure of a Man is a 1916 American silent drama film directed by Jack Conway and starring J. Warren Kerrigan, Louise Lovely and Katherine Campbell.

Cast
 J. Warren Kerrigan as John Fairmeadow 
 Louise Lovely as Pattie Batch 
 Katherine Campbell as Jenny Hendy 
 Ivor McFadden as Billy 
 Marion Emmons as Donnie 
 Harry Carter as Jack Flack 
 Marc B. Robbins as Tom Hendy

References

Bibliography
 James Robert Parish & Michael R. Pitts. Film directors: a guide to their American films. Scarecrow Press, 1974.

External links
 

1916 films
1916 drama films
1910s English-language films
American silent feature films
Silent American drama films
Films directed by Jack Conway
American black-and-white films
Universal Pictures films
1910s American films